Haematobosca alcis, the moose fly, is a species of blood-feeding muscidae in the family Muscidae. It is found in Europe.The moose fly, Haematobosca alcis (Snow) is abundant in Yellowstone National Park

References

Muscidae
Articles created by Qbugbot
Insects described in 1891